Cypriot Arabic, also known as Cypriot Maronite Arabic or Sanna, is a moribund variety of Arabic spoken by the Maronite community of Cyprus. Formerly speakers were mostly situated in Kormakitis, but following the Turkish invasion of Cyprus in 1974, the majority relocated to the south and dispersed, leading to the decline of the language. Traditionally bilingual in Cypriot Greek, as of some time prior to 2000, all remaining speakers of Cypriot Arabic were over 30 years of age. A 2011 census reported that, of the 3,656 Maronite Cypriots in Republic of Cyprus-controlled areas, none declared Cypriot Arabic as their first language.

History and classification
Cypriot Arabic was first introduced to Cyprus by Maronites who came mainly from Syria and Lebanon as early as the seventh century, with waves of immigration up to the thirteenth century. Since 2002, it is one of UNESCO-designated severely endangered languages and, since 2008, it is recognised as a minority language of Cyprus, coinciding with an attempt to revitalise the language.

Cypriot Arabic has in the past been assigned to a Syrian-Lebanese or Levantine Arabic classification, likely owing to the contemporary presence of a large Lebanese-speaking Maronite community on the mainland. However, more recently it has been shown to share a large number of common features with the qeltu or North Mesopotamian Arabic dialects of Iraq, Syria, and Turkey, and a pre-Cypriot medieval antecedent has been deduced as belonging to this dialect area. Indications of an Aramaic substrate suggest it was close to the time of the language shift from Aramaic to Arabic; other features are common to those of Syro-Lebanese and Palestinian, which go back to a period in which there was a dialect continuum between the Mesopotamian dialects and the Syrian dialect area.

In the Cypriot stage, the language was extensively restructured through contact with Cypriot Greek, acquiring numerous features and constraints not typical of Arabic. Essentially unintelligible to mainland Arabic speakers, it is characterized as an isolated "peripheral Arabic" along with others such as Maltese. Its Arabic component is a hybrid of dialects from diverse areas and times of Southeastern Anatolia, northern Syria, and Mesopotamia, as well as the Levant, offering unique insights into the historical evolution of Eastern Arabic.

Phonology

 argues that the sound system of Cypriot Arabic has been heavily influenced by that of Cypriot Greek. Cypriot Arabic has lost all emphatic consonants and stop-voicing opposition (though this is subject to debate in literature)—but retained gemination. Geminate voiceless stop consonants surface as aspirates.

Affricates  occur as allophones of clusters . There are five vowel phonemes, and two diphthongs, . Phonological rules observed in Cypriot Arabic include:
 Historical stop + stop clusters are dissimilated to fricative + stop.
  are palatalized to  before .  is fully assimilated.
 An epenthetic stop occurs between a nasal and a continuant or sonorant. The place of articulation is inherited from the nasal before it and the voicing from the continuant or sonorant that follows.

Phenomena similar to the first three are also observed in Cypriot Greek.

Vocabulary

Writing system
In May 2009, the Committee of Experts for the Codification of Cypriot Maronite Arabic submitted an action plan for the codification and revitalisation of the language to the Cypriot government. The Public Foundation for European Comparative Minority Research reported in 2006 that both the Greek and Latin script had been suggested for adoption.  The Greek script is used for Cypriot Arabic in a Cypriot Arabic–Greek dictionary.

Alexander Borg, a linguist specialising in the language, created a Latin-based alphabet with elements from Maltese and Greek that the non-governmental organisation for the revitalisation of the language "Hki Fi Sanna" endorsed in 2007, and some "small texts" have apparently been translated into it.

All letters loosely represent their IPA values, with some exceptions:

Examples
Phrases

See also
 Cypriot Maronite Arabic Swadesh list
 Languages of Cyprus
 Varieties of Arabic

Notes and references

Bibliography

 
 
 
 
 
 
 
 
 
 
 
 
 
 
 </ref>

External links

 Cypriot Maronite Arabic grammar (in Greek), includes a list of published literature on the language
 
 

Arab diaspora in Europe
Arabic, Cypriot
Arabic, Cypriot
Lebanese diaspora in Cyprus
Endangered Afroasiatic languages
Maronites
Mesopotamian Arabic